Hupac is a railway company in Switzerland. Hupac's Shuttle Net has 110 intermodal trains per day across Europe. Hupac also offers a rolling highway from Basel to Lugano. In 2009, volumes carried fell by 13.5%, to 607,284 road shipments; but profit increased. In 2010, traffic volumes increased by 13.7%.

Hupac has been in the intermodal freight transport industry for 30 years.

In August 2010 Hupac took a 25% stake in Crossrail. In September 2010 Hupac joined with SBB Cargo to form a joint venture called SBB Cargo International, to be headquartered in Olten. Hupac is a member of the UIRR.

See also
SBB Cargo
SBB Cargo International

References

External links
Hupac website

Railway companies of Switzerland
Railway companies of Italy
Rail freight transport in Switzerland
UIRR
Railway companies established in 1967
Swiss companies established in 1967
Italian companies established in 1967